Gömmece may refer to:

 Gömmece, Kastamonu, village in Kastamonu Province, Turkey
 Gömmece, Tarsus, village in Mersin Province, Turkey